André Fialho Mensurado (born April 7, 1994) is a Portuguese mixed martial artist, currently competing in the Welterweight division of the Ultimate Fighting Championship. He is the former UAE Warriors champion and has also competed for the PFL, Bellator and LFA.

Background 

As a teenager, Fialho was interested in football and was also an amateur boxing champion in his native country of Portugal, after being convinced to begin boxing by his father, who was a former boxer and founded his own gym in 2019.

However, after meeting a MMA coach when on holiday in the Algarve, he decided to focus solely on MMA. In 2015 he left for the United States of America in search of his dream, to be a professional MMA fighter.

Mixed martial arts career

Bellator MMA

After winning 6 fights on the regional circuit, all by finish, Fialho made his Bellator debut against Manuel Meraz on February 26, 2016 at Bellator 150.
He won the fight via TKO in just 29 seconds.

In his sophomore performance on May 14, 2016 at Bellator 154, Fialho faced Rick Reger and won the bout via TKO stoppage in the first round.

In his highest profile fight for the promotion, Fialho faced Chidi Njokuani at Bellator 167 on December 3, 2016. He lost the fight via knockout just 21 seconds into the first round.

Fialho faced A.J. Matthews at Bellator 181 on July 14, 2017. After a back-and-forth contest, in which both fighters were able to land significant strikes, hurting their opponent, ultimately Fialho won the bout via split decision.

Fialho was scheduled to face Brennan Ward on October 12, 2018, at Bellator 207. However on September 10, 2018, Ward notified the promotion that he will retire from MMA. Fialho was instead scheduled against Javier Torres. He won the close bout via majority decision.

Professional Fighters League

Fialho joined the PFL as a tournament replacement for PFL Season 2018 Middleweight Champion Louis Taylor at PFL 1 on May 9, 2019. As a result, he faced Chris Curtis. Fialho lost the bout via third-round knockout.

Fialho fought Glaico França at PFL 7 on October 11, 2019. He lost the bout via majority decision, but França tested positive for stanozolol and so the bout was overturned to a no contest.

Legacy Fighting Alliance and XMMA

Fialho faced Antonio dos Santos Jr. at LFA 92 on October 2, 2020. He lost the fight via unanimous decision.

Fialho fought former UFC fighter James Vick at XMMA 1 on January 30, 2021.
Fialho won the fight by second-round technical knockout.

UAE Warriors

Fialho completed his time with the company with a 3-0 record. He debuted against Sang Hoon Yoo at UAE Warriors 20, winning the bout via TKO stoppage 18 seconds into the bout. He would then go on to defeat Lincoln Henrique at UAE Warriors 22 on September 4, 2021, collecting another first round TKO. He would then get booked against UFC vet Stefan Sekulic on October 29, 2021 at UAE Warriors 24. He would win the bout via TKO after dropping Sekulic with an elbow in the clinch and then finishing him on the ground.

Ultimate Fighting Championship

In his debut, Fialho fought Michel Pereira on short notice at UFC 270, on January 22, 2022.
He lost the fight by unanimous decision.

Fialho next faced Miguel Baeza on April 16, 2022 at UFC on ESPN: Luque vs. Muhammad 2.
He won the fight via technical knockout in round one.
The win earned him a Performance of the Night  bonus.

Fialho faced Cameron VanCamp on May 7, 2022 at UFC 274. He won the fight by knockout in round one. The win also earned Fialho his second consecutive Performance of the Night bonus award.

Fialho faced Jake Matthews on June 11, 2022, at UFC 275. He lost the bout via knockout in the second round.

Fialho faced Muslim Salikhov  on November 19, 2022, at UFC Fight Night 215. He lost the bout via technical knockout in the third round.

Championships & accomplishments

Mixed martial arts
 Ultimate Fighting Championship
 Performance of the Night (Two times) 
 Tied for most bouts in a calendar year (5 bouts in 2022)

Mixed martial arts record

| Loss
|align=center|16–6 (1)
|Muslim Salikhov
|TKO (spinning wheel kick and punches)
|UFC Fight Night: Nzechukwu vs. Cuțelaba
|
|align=center|3
|align=center|1:03
||Las Vegas, Nevada, United States
|-->
|-
|Loss
|align=center|16–5 (1)
|Jake Matthews
|KO (punches)
|UFC 275
|
|align=center|2
|align=center|2:24
|Kallang, Singapore
|
|-
|Win
|align=center|16–4 (1)
|Cameron VanCamp
|KO (punch)
|UFC 274
|
|align=center|1
|align=center|2:35
|Phoenix, Arizona, United States
| 
|-
|Win
|align=center|15–4 (1)
|Miguel Baeza
|TKO (punches)
|UFC on ESPN: Luque vs. Muhammad 2
|
|align=center|1
|align=center|4:39
|Las Vegas, Nevada, United States
| 
|-
|Loss
|align=center|14–4 (1)
|Michel Pereira
|Decision (unanimous)
|UFC 270
|
|align=center|3
|align=center|5:00
|Anaheim, California, United States
|
|-
|Win
|align=center|14–3 (1)
|Stefan Sekulić
|TKO (elbow and punches)
|UAE Warriors 24
|
|align=center|1
|align=center|1:53
|Abu Dhabi, United Arab Emirates
| 
|-
|Win
|align=center|13–3 (1)
|Lincoln Henrique
|KO (punches)
|UAE Warriors 22
|
|align=center|1
|align=center|4:47
|Abu Dhabi, United Arab Emirates
| 
|-
|Win
|align=center|12–3 (1)
|Sang Hoon Yoo
|TKO (punches)
|UAE Warriors 20
|
|align=center|1
|align=center|0:18
|Abu Dhabi, United Arab Emirates
| 
|-
|Win
|align=center|11–3 (1)
|James Vick
|TKO (punches)
|XMMA: Vick vs Fialho
|
|align=center|2
|align=center|2:21
| West Palm Beach, Florida, United States
| 
|-
|Loss
|align=center|10–3 (1)
| Antônio dos Santos Jr.
|Decision (unanimous)
| LFA 92
|
|align=center|3
|align=center|5:00
| Hartman Arena, Kansas, United States
|
|-
|NC
|align=center|10–2 (1)
| Glaico França
|NC (overturned)
| PFL 7
|
|align=center|2
|align=center|5:00
| Las Vegas, Nevada, United States
| 
|-
|Loss
|align=center|10–2 
|Chris Curtis
|TKO (punches)
| PFL 1
|
|align=center|3
|align=center|4:17
|Uniondale, New York, United States
|
|-
|Win
|align=center|10–1
| Javier Torres
|Decision (majority)
| Bellator 207
|
|align=center|3
|align=center|5:00
| Uncasville, Connecticut, United States
|
|-
|Win
|align=center|9–1
| A.J. Matthews
|Decision (split)
| Bellator 181
|
|align=center|3
|align=center|5:00
| Thackerville, Oklahoma, United States
|
|-
|Loss
|align=center|8–1
|Chidi Njokuani
|TKO (punches)
|Bellator 167
|
|align=center|1
|align=center|0:21
|Thackerville, Oklahoma, United States
|
|-
|Win
|align=center|8–0
| Rick Reger
|KO (punches)
| Bellator 154
|
|align=center|1
|align=center|2:11
| San Jose, California, United States
|
|-
|Win
|align=center|7–0
| Manuel Meraz
|KO (punches)
| Bellator 150
|
|align=center|1
|align=center|0:29
| Mulvane, Kansas, United States
|
|-
|Win
|align=center|6–0
| Alvaro Sanches
|KO (punches)
| International Pro Combat 6 
|
|align=center|1
|align=center|0:53
| Estoril, Portugal
|
|-
| Win
| align=center| 5–0
| Carlos Antonio de Souza
| TKO (punches)
| rowspan=3|Cage Fighters 4
| rowspan=3|
| align=center| 1
| align=center| 2:31
| rowspan=3| Maia, Portugal
| 
|-
| Win
| align=center| 4–0
| Giovanni Diniz
| TKO (punches)
| align=center| 1
| align=center| 1:00
|
|-
| Win
| align=center| 3–0
| Wanderson Silva
| TKO (punches)
| align=center| 2
| align=center| 1:52
|
|-
|Win
|align=center|2–0
| Nuno Faria
| Submission (rear-naked choke)
| International Pro Combat 5
|
|align=center|1
|align=center|3:17
| Estoril, Portugal
|
|-
|Win
|align=center|1–0
| Henry Deiby Lima
| TKO (punches)
| Invictus Pro MMA League 1
|
|align=center|1
|align=center|3:46
| Estoril, Portugal
|
|-

See also 
 List of current UFC fighters
 List of male mixed martial artists

References

External links 
  
 

1994 births
Living people
Portuguese male mixed martial artists
Welterweight mixed martial artists
Mixed martial artists utilizing boxing
Mixed martial artists utilizing Brazilian jiu-jitsu
Ultimate Fighting Championship male fighters
Portuguese male boxers
Portuguese practitioners of Brazilian jiu-jitsu
Sportspeople from Cascais